is a railway station on the  Osaka Metro Sennichimae Line in Higashinari-ku, Osaka, Japan.

Layout
There is an island platform with two tracks on the 2nd basement.

Surroundings
National Route 308
Doggyman H.A. Co., Ltd.
KOKUYO Co., Ltd.

Bus
Subway Shin-Fukae (Osaka City Bus)
Route 86 for  / for 

Higashinari-ku, Osaka
Osaka Metro stations
Railway stations in Japan opened in 1969